The 1932 San Francisco Dons football team was an American football team that represented the University of San Francisco as an independent during the 1932 college football season. In their first season under head coach Spud Lewis, the Dons compiled a 2–6 record and were outscored by a combined total of 90 to 77.

Spud Lewis was hired as the team's head football coach in January 1932. He had been a star football player at Stanford and had most recently served as an assistant coach under Dick Hanley at Northwestern. Lewis replaced Jimmy Needles, who coached the football team from 1924 to 1931.

Schedule

References

San Francisco
San Francisco Dons football seasons
San Francisco Dons football